Jafariyeh (also Romanized as Ja‘farīyeh; also known as Do Qal‘eh, Qal‘eh-ye Ja‘farbag, and Qal‘eh-ye Ja‘far Beyg) is a village in Hayaquq-e Nabi Rural District, in the Central District of Tuyserkan County, Hamadan Province, Iran. At the 2006 census, its population was 1,774, in 462 families.

References 

Populated places in Tuyserkan County